The Guatopo National Park Is a protected area with the status of national park in the north of the South American country of Venezuela. It is located specifically between the states of Miranda and Guárico, bordered on the north by the Cordillera de la Costa and the Barlovento Plain, on the south by the Piedemonte Llanero, on the east it borders on the continuation of the Serranía del Interior and The west with the continuation of the same Serranía and with the Valleys of the Tuy.

These lands were owned by Don Pedro de Ponte Andrade Jaspe and Montenegro, registered, bought in 1687 by Don Francisco Araujo de Figueroa and Don Diego Fenandez de la Mota and sold to Don Pedro de Ponte Andrade Jaspe and Montenegro in 1701 by the widow Maria Araujo Of Figueroa heiress of Captain Diego Fernandez de la Mota.

These lands were declared a national park in 1958 and expropriated by the Venezuelan government in accordance with Presidential Decree No. 257 of April 8, 1960, published in Official Gazette No. 26230 of April 11, 1960.

Gallery

See also
List of national parks of Venezuela
Sierra Nevada National Park (Venezuela)

References

National parks of Venezuela
Protected areas established in 1958
Geography of Miranda (state)
Geography of Guárico
1958 establishments in Venezuela
Tourist attractions in Mérida (state)
Tourist attractions in Guárico